Cricău is a commune located in the central part of Alba County, Transylvania, Romania. It has a population of 2,097 and is composed of three villages: Craiva (Királypataka), Cricău and Tibru (Tibor).

The river Cricău flows through the commune.

History

Ancient times

The Dacian fortress on top of Piatra Craivii is believed by many archaeologists to be the location of Apulon.
Apulon was an important Dacian political, economic and social center, the capital of the Apuli tribe.

It was first mentioned by the Ancient Greek geographer Ptolemy in his Geographia, under the name Apulon. It is also depicted in the Tabula Peutingeriana as an important city named Apula, at the cross road of two main routes: one coming from Blandiana, the other from Acidava. The two roads merge at Apula, with the next stop on the route being Brucla.

The Latin name of Apulum is derived from Apulon.

Natives
Nicolae Stanciu (b. 1993)

Gallery

References

Communes in Alba County
Localities in Transylvania